Facheiroa cephaliomelana is a species of plant in the family Cactaceae.

Distribution
It is endemic to Brazil.   in south-central and south-western Bahia and central-northern Minas Gerais states.

This species is found at 550 –750 m in elevation. Its natural habitat is rocky areas.

It is an IUCN Red List Vulnerable species, threatened by habitat loss.

References

cephaliomelana
Cacti of South America
Endemic flora of Brazil
Flora of Bahia
Flora of Minas Gerais
Vulnerable flora of South America
Taxonomy articles created by Polbot